Feminnem is a girl group from Croatia and Bosnia and Herzegovina composed of three members. They represented both countries at the Eurovision Song Contest; Bosnia and Herzegovina in 2005 (with original members Ivana Marić, Neda Parmać and Pamela Ramljak) and Croatia in 2010 (when the group consisted of Nika Antolos, Parmać and Ramljak). On 21 February 2012 Pamela, Neda and Nika decided to start solo careers and leave Feminnem and effectively disbanded the group. They were named after American rapper Eminem.
In May 2022, the group were decided to get back together, and their members posted on social media announcement of their comeback.

Band members

Neda Parmać
Parmać was born 28 April 1985 in Split, SR Croatia, SFR Yugoslavia and took dance lessons from an early age. At the age of thirteen she performed as member the band Kompas. In 2004 she entered the Hrvatski Idol competition (the Croatian version of Pop Idol). Her self-confident approach and ability to improvise appealed to the audience, as best seen in her rendition of Michael Jackson's Beat It, when she continued to perform despite forgetting the lyrics. She finished third, with the show being won by Žanamari Lalić. Together with two other finalists, she went on to create Feminnem.

Nika Antolos
Antolos was born 10 August 1989 in Rijeka, SR Croatia, SFR Yugoslavia.

Pamela Ramljak
Ramljak was born 24 December 1979 in Čapljina, SR Bosnia and Herzegovina, SFR Yugoslavia. She attended the Music Academy in Zagreb, and was back up vocal for Toni Cetinski and Amila Glamočak. In 2004 she was one of the finalists on Hrvatski Idol.

Formation, disbanding and reunion
The group formed in 2004 following the appearance of the three original members on Hrvatski Idol. They have produced one hit single, "Volim te, mrzim te" ("I love you, I hate you"). In 2012 the group decided to split and effectively disbanded the group.

In May 2022, it was announced that Feminnem will reunite, and shortly after, their new single, "Zajedno" (Together) was released.

Eurovision Song Contest 
2005
Feminnem won the right to represent Bosnia and Herzegovina in the Eurovision Song Contest 2005 in Ukraine with their entry "Call Me", an up-tempo pop song written and composed by Andrej Babić. They had automatic entry to the Eurosong Final, where they finished in fourteenth out of twenty-four participants.

2007
Feminnem hoped to represent Croatia in Eurovision Song Contest 2007 in Helsinki, Finland with the song "Navika", but they placed only ninth with 16 points. The winner was Dragonfly, featuring Dado Topić with "Vjerujem u ljubav".

2009
Feminnem again hoped to represent Croatia in Eurovision Song Contest 2009 in Moscow, Russia with the song "Poljupci u boji", but they placed third with 28 points. The winner was Igor Cukrov feat. Andrea Šušnjara with "Lijepa Tena".

2010
Feminnem took part at the Croatian national final for the third time in 2010, hoping to represent the country in the Eurovision Song Contest 2010 to be held in Bærum, Greater Oslo, Norway with their song "Lako je sve". Having finished only fourth in the semi-final, they nonetheless went on to win the final, receiving maximum points from both the jury and the telephone voters. They therefore succeeded in representing Croatia at Eurovision, however they failed to qualify for the final, placing thirteenth in a field of seventeen entries in semi-final two.

Discography

Feminnem Show (2005)
Lako je sve (2010)
Easy to See (2010)

See also 
Bosnia and Herzegovina in the Eurovision Song Contest 2005
 Croatia in the Eurovision Song Contest 2010
 List of all-female bands

References

External links

Official Site 
Interview with Feminnem
Biography at EscToday
 Myspace Officiel

Croatian women singers
Girl groups
Bosnia and Herzegovina musical groups
Bosnia and Herzegovina musicians
Eurovision Song Contest entrants for Bosnia and Herzegovina
Eurovision Song Contest entrants of 2005
Eurovision Song Contest entrants for Croatia
Eurovision Song Contest entrants of 2010
Croatian pop music groups
Musical groups established in 2004
Musical groups disestablished in 2012
Musical groups reestablished in 2022